The National Film and Television Institute (NAFTI) is an educational institution in Accra, Ghana.

History and operations
It was established in 1978 by the Government of Ghana as a public institution of higher education in film and television production. Since its inception, the institute has offered professional and academic education in film and television education, in affiliation with the University of Ghana. It is a full member of the International Association of Film and Television Schools (CILECT).

It was announced in April 2016 that in the next few years, the institute will be converted into a media and creative arts university college.

See also

 Cinema of Africa
 Culture of Ghana
 Education in Ghana
 Film school
 List of schools in Ghana

References

External links
 

1978 establishments in Ghana
Educational institutions established in 1978
Film schools in Ghana
Education in Accra
Television in Ghana
Television organizations